Ramachandrapuram mandal is one of the 34 mandals in Tirupati district of the Indian state of Andhra Pradesh. It is under the administration of Tirupati revenue division and the headquarters are located at Kammapalle.

History 
Ramachandrapuram mandal was a part of Chittoor district until 2022. It was made part of the newly formed Tirupati district effective from 4 April 2022 by the Y. S. Jagan Mohan Reddy-led Government of Andhra Pradesh.

Geography 
The mandal is bounded by Chandragiri, Tirupati (rural), Vadamalapeta and Vedurukuppam mandals.

Administration 
Ramachandrapuram mandal is a part of Tirupati revenue division. The headquarters are located at Kammapalle.

References 

Mandals in Tirupati district